The discography of American rap rock band Hollywood Undead consists of eight studio albums, one live album, one remix album, four extended plays, forty-seven singles and thirty-seven music videos.

Albums

Studio albums

Live albums

Remix albums

Extended plays

Singles

As lead artist

As featured artist

Other certified songs

Music videos

Traditional videos

Lyric videos

References

External links
 Official website
 Hollywood Undead at AllMusic
 

Discographies of American artists
Rap rock discographies